Maximum II is Japanese dance unit, MAX's second album. It was released on December 25, 1997 by record label, avex trax. The album is a departure from their debut effort completely void of the Eurobeat sound that made the group popular instead filled with slick R&B influenced pop numbers and ballads. The album peaked at #2 on the Oricon charts, but had their best opening sales number with over 700,000 units sold. First pressings of the album included a slipcase and six month calendar.

Track list 

MAX (band) albums
1997 albums
Avex Group albums